Kevin Michael Wilkinson (11 June 1958 – 17 July 1999) was an English drummer, who was based in Baydon, Wiltshire, England.

Career
Born in Stoke-on-Trent, Staffordshire, Wilkinson is credited as a former official member of several successful British new wave acts, including the League of Gentlemen (1980), the Waterboys (1983–84), China Crisis (1983–89) and Squeeze (1995–96), as well as drummer for Holly Beth Vincent (1981–82). He also appeared in some of his affiliated bands' music videos.

Throughout the course of his career, Wilkinson was a session musician, performing with other artists as diverse as Fish and The Proclaimers, China Crisis, and Howard Jones. He was not related to Squeeze's bass player, Keith Wilkinson, although he was briefly a member of Squeeze at the same time as his namesake, and they can be seen in the video for "This Summer".

Personal life 
Wilkinson was married to Marilyn Fitzgerald. They had three children.

Death 
Wilkinson died by suicide on 17 July 1999, aged 41, by hanging himself in the family home in Baydon, near Swindon.

References

External links
 
 AllMusic credits listing

1958 births
People from Stoke-on-Trent
People from Swindon
1999 suicides
English drummers
British male drummers
New wave drummers
English new wave musicians
Squeeze (band) members
The Waterboys members
Suicides by hanging in England
20th-century English musicians
Musicians from Wiltshire
20th-century British male musicians
1999 deaths